Choragus sheppardi is a species of beetle in family Anthribidae. It is found in the Palearctic    (Britain,  Ireland, France, Northern Central and Eastern Europe, European Russia, Asia Minor, Middle East

References

Anthribidae
Beetles described in 1819